Talal Hassoun Abdul Kader (born 1953) is an Iraqi weightlifter. He competed in the 1980 Summer Olympics.

References

1953 births
Living people
Weightlifters at the 1980 Summer Olympics
Iraqi male weightlifters
Olympic weightlifters of Iraq
Asian Games medalists in weightlifting
Weightlifters at the 1978 Asian Games
Asian Games bronze medalists for Iraq
Medalists at the 1978 Asian Games
20th-century Iraqi people